Youssef Ahmed Hassan Ahmed Mohamed (born 20 June 2003) is an Egyptian professional footballer who plays as a striker for Zamalek SC.

Career statistics

Club

Notes

References

2003 births
Living people
Egyptian footballers
Egypt youth international footballers
Association football forwards
Al Mokawloon Al Arab SC players
Wadi Degla SC players
Zamalek SC players
Egyptian Premier League players